is a private university in Dazaifu, Fukuoka, Japan, established in 1998.

External links
 Official website 

Educational institutions established in 1998
Private universities and colleges in Japan
Universities and colleges in Fukuoka Prefecture
Buildings and structures in Dazaifu, Fukuoka
1998 establishments in Japan